Red Covered Bridge may refer to:

Red Covered Bridge (Princeton, Illinois), listed on the National Register of Historic Places in Bureau County, Illinois
Red Covered Bridge (Rosedale, Indiana)
Red Covered Bridge (Liverpool, Pennsylvania), listed on the National Register of Historic Places in Perry County, Pennsylvania
Red Covered Bridge (Morristown, Vermont), listed on the National Register of Historic Places in Lamoille County, Vermont